Veloropsis rufoflava is a species of beetle in the family Cerambycidae, and the only species in the genus Veloropsis. It was described by Breuning in 1969.

References

Desmiphorini
Beetles described in 1969